Abraham Nemeth (October 16, 1918 – October 2, 2013) was an American mathematician. He was Professor of Mathematics at the University of Detroit Mercy in Detroit, Michigan. Nemeth was blind and is known for developing Nemeth Braille, a system for blind people to read and write mathematics.

Early life
Nemeth was born in New York City on the Lower East Side of Manhattan into a large family of Hungarian Jewish immigrants who spoke Yiddish. He was blind from birth from a combination of macular degeneration and retinitis pigmentosa.

He attended public schools at first but did most of his primary and secondary education at the Jewish Guild for the Blind school in Yonkers, New York. His undergraduate studies were at Brooklyn College where he studied psychology. He earned a Master of Arts degree in Psychology from Columbia University.

Nemeth studied mathematics and physics at Brooklyn College. He did not major in mathematics because his academic advisors discouraged him. However, tired of what he felt were unfulfilling jobs at agencies of the blind, and with the encouragement of his first wife Florence, he decided to continue his education in mathematics. He received a Ph.D. in mathematics from Wayne State University.

Academic career
Nemeth taught part-time at various colleges in New York. Though his employers were sometimes reluctant to hire him knowing that he was blind, his reputation grew as it became apparent that he was a capable mathematician and teacher. Nemeth distinguished himself from many other blind people by being able to write visual print letters and mathematical symbols on paper and blackboards just like sighted people, a skill he learned as a child. Nemeth says that this skill allowed him to succeed in mathematics, during an era without much technology, when even Braille was difficult to use in mathematics. During the 1950s he moved to Detroit, Michigan to accept a position at the University of Detroit working with Keith Rosenberg. He remained there for 30 years, retiring in 1985. During the late 1960s he studied computer science and began the university's program in that subject.

Importance to mathematics and blindness
As the coursework became more advanced, he found that he needed a braille code that would more effectively handle the kinds of math and science material he was tackling.  Ultimately, he developed the Nemeth Braille Code for Mathematics and Science Notation, which was published in 1952.  The Nemeth Code has gone through 4 revisions since its initial development, and continues to be widely used today.

Nemeth is also responsible for the rules of MathSpeak, a system for orally communicating mathematical text.  In the course of his studies, Nemeth found that he needed to make use of sighted readers to read otherwise inaccessible math texts and other materials.  Likewise, he needed a method for dictating his math work and other materials for transcription into print. The conventions Nemeth developed for efficiently reading mathematical text out loud have evolved into MathSpeak.

Nemeth was instrumental in the development of Unified English Braille (UEB) from 1991 to at least 2001, though he eventually parted ways with others developing that code, and instead worked on a parallel effort called the Universal Braille System (sometimes abbreviated as NUBS with his name appended to the front).  As of 2012, UEB was officially adopted by BANA as the standard for literary braille, but Nemeth Code was also fully retained as an optional official coding system.  Work on NUBS may continue, or it might be merged into a future rules-update to the official Nemeth Code (the most recent official rules-update to Nemeth Code was in 2013).

Post-retirement
Nemeth was still working on the Nemeth code when he died. Nemeth had been active in the Jewish community since childhood, and since his retirement from academic mathematics he had been transcribing Hebrew prayer books into Braille.

Nemeth was an active member of the National Federation of the Blind. He has written several short stories and made speeches for the NFB about his life as a blind mathematician. On February 11, 2006, Nemeth suffered a massive heart attack, but recovered and was well enough to attend the July 2006 NFB convention and accept the 2006 Louis Braille award which the organization gave him. On July 9, 2009, he was honored by the NFB as a co-recipient of the Dr. Jacob Bolotin award.

Trivia
Nemeth's obituary was prematurely published twice in Jewish and blindness-related magazines, when workers at the magazines believed he had died when in fact his brother and wife had actually died.

Nemeth was a member of the United States Democratic Party but was appointed by a Republican governor of Michigan as chairman of the state commission for the blind, a position in which he served for two years, though he said that he did not like politics.

He was a proficient pianist who loved entertaining others, had an amazing memory for dates and information and enjoyed telling jokes and stories that he could match to almost any subject or occasion.

See also
 Jewish Braille Institute
 Jewish Heritage for the Blind

References

External links
 Profile of Abraham Nemeth at the MathSpeak Initiative web site
 Profile of Abraham Nemeth at the Division on Visual Impairment of the Council for Exceptional Children
 North Carolina Conference on Visual Impairment and Blindness page with a biographical section on Nemeth
 Interview with Abraham Nemeth at nextbook.org
 Information on the origins and rules of MathSpeak
“To Light A Candle with Mathematics”: a short story by Nemeth published in the short story collection “As The Twig Is Bent”, part of the NFB Kernel Book series.
Nemeth’s Braille Award

 Photo Blog to Nemeth's 3 day visit to The New York Institute for Special Education (October 2007)

1918 births
2013 deaths
20th-century American mathematicians
21st-century American mathematicians
Columbia University alumni
University of Detroit Mercy faculty
Jewish American scientists
Blind academics
Scientists from New York City
American people of Hungarian-Jewish descent
Brooklyn College alumni
Wayne State University alumni
Mathematicians from New York (state)
21st-century American Jews